Albertville Regional Airport , also known as Thomas J. Brumlik Field, is a city-owned, public-use airport located three nautical miles (5 km) southwest of the central business district of Albertville, in Marshall County, Alabama, United States. It was formerly known as Albertville Municipal Airport.

This airport is included in the FAA's National Plan of Integrated Airport Systems for 2011–2015 and 2009–2013, both of which categorized it as a general aviation facility.

History 
Albertville Municipal Airport was activated by the FAA in July 1962.

Facilities and aircraft 
The airport covers an area of 77 acres (31 ha) at an elevation of 1,032 feet (315 m) above mean sea level. It contains a single asphalt runway, 5/23, measuring 6,114 by 100 feet (1,864 by 30 m). Its markings are meant for non-precision flying.

For the 12-month period ending July 19, 2007, the airport had 25,400 aircraft operations, an average of 69 per day: 22% local general aviation and 78% itinerant general aviation. At that time there were 53 aircraft based at this airport: 72% single-engine, 17% multi-engine, 6% jet and 6% helicopter.

See also
 List of airports in Alabama

References

External links 
 Aerial image as of March 1997 from USGS The National Map
 
 

Airports in Alabama
Transportation buildings and structures in Marshall County, Alabama
Airports established in 1962
1962 establishments in Alabama